In electronics, the NORBIT family of modules is a very early form (since 1960) of digital logic developed by Philips (and also provided through  and Mullard) that uses modules containing discrete components to build logic function blocks in resistor–transistor logic (RTL) or diode–transistor logic (DTL) technology.

Overview
The system was originally conceived as building blocks for solid-state hard-wired programmed logic controllers (the predecessors of programmable logic controllers (PLC)) to replace electro-mechanical relay logic in industrial control systems for process control and automation applications, similar to early Telefunken/AEG Logistat, Siemens Simatic, BBC Sigmatronic, ACEC Logacec or  Estacord systems.

Each available logical function was recognizable by the color of its plastic container, black, blue, red, green, violet, etc. The most important circuit block contained a NOR gate (hence the name), but there were also blocks containing drivers, and a timer circuit similar to the later 555 timer IC.

The original Norbit modules of the YL 6000 series introduced in 1960 had potted single in-line packages with up to ten long flying leads arranged in two groups of up to five leads in a row. These modules were specified for frequencies of less than 1 kHz at ±24 V supply.

Also available in 1960 were so called Combi-Element modules in single-in line packages with ten evenly spaced stiff leads in a row (5.08 mm / 0.2-inch pitch) for mounting on a PCB. They were grouped in the 1-series (aka "100 kHz series") with ±6 V supply. The newer 10-series and 20-series had similarly sized packages, but came with an additional parallel row of nine staggered leads for a total of 19 leads. The 10-series uses germanium alloy transistors, whereas in the 20-series silicon planar transistors are used for a higher cut-off frequency of up to 1 MHz (vs. 30 kHz) and a higher allowed temperature range of +85 °C (vs. +55 °C).

In 1967, the Philips/Mullard NORBIT 2 aka Valvo NORBIT-S family of modules was introduced, first consisting of the 60-series for frequencies up to 10 kHz at a single supply voltage of 24 V, only. Later, the 61-series, containing thyristor trigger and control modules, was added. A 90-series became available in the mid-1970s as well. There were three basic types contained in a large (one by two inch-sized) 17 pins dual in-line package, with nine pins spaced 5.08 mm (0.2-inch) on one side and eight staggered pins on the other side.

Modules

Original Norbit family
YL 6000 series
 YL6000 - NOR gate (red) ("NOR")
 YL6001 - Emitter follower (yellow) ("EF")
 YL6004 - High power output (Double-sized module) ("HP")
 YL6005, YL6005/00 - Counter unit (triple binary) ("3C") (violet)
 YL6005/05 - Single divide by 2 counter (violet) ("1C")
 YL6006 - Timer (brown) ("TU")
 YL6007 - Chassis ("CU")
 YL6008 - Medium power output (orange) ("MP")
 YL6009 - Low power output (white) ("LP")
 YL6010 - Photo-electric detector head ("PD")
 YL6011 - Photo-electric lamp head ("PL")
 YL6012 - Twin 2-input NOR gate (black) ("2.2 NOR")

YL 6100 series
 YL6101 - Rectifier unit
 YL6102 - Rectifier unit
 YL6103/00 - Regel-Einheit
 YL6103/01 - Regel-Einheit
 YL6104 - Längsglied für Regel-Einheit
 YL6105 - Regel-Einheit

Relay series
 88930/30 - Eingangs-/Ausgangseinheit
 88930/33 - Vorwahl-Zähleinheit
 88930/36 - Zweifach-Programm-Einheit
 88930/37 - Vierfach-Programm-Einheit
 88930/39 - Ausgangs-Einheit
 88930/42 - Leer-Einheit
 88930/48 - Impulsformer-Einheit
 88930/51 - Programm-Vorbereitungs-Einheit
 88930/54 - Rückstell-Einheit
 88930/57 - Relais-Verstärker-Einheit
 88930/60 - Relaisblock-Einheit
 88930/64 - Speise-Einheit

Combi-Element family
1-serie / B890000 series
 B893000, B164903 - Twin 3-input AND gates  (orange) ("2.3A1", "2x3N1")
 B893001, B164904 - Twin 2-input AND gates (orange) ("2.2A1", "2x2N1")
 B893002, 2P72729 - Twin 3-input OR gates (orange) ("2.3O1", "23O1", "2x3P1")
 B893003, 2P72730 - Twin 2-input OR gates (orange) ("2.2O1", "22O1", "2x2P1")
 B894002, B164910 - Twin inverter amplifier (yellow) ("2IA1", "2.IA1", "2xIA1")
 B894005, 2P72728 - Twin inverter amplifier (yellow) ("2IA2", "2xIA2")
 B894001, B164909 - Twin emitter follower (yellow) ("2EF1", 2xEF1")
 B894003, 2P72727 - Twin emitter follower (yellow) ("2EF2", "2xEF2")
 B894000, B164907 - Emitter follower/inverter amplifier (yellow) ("EF1/IA1")
 B895000, B164901 - Pulse shaper (Schmitt trigger + amplifier) (green) ("PS1")
 B895001, B164908 - One-shot multivibrator ("OS1")
 B895003 - One-shot multivibrator ("OS2")
 B892000, B164902 - Flip-flop (red) ("FF1")
 B892001, 2P72707 - Shift-register Flip-flop (red) ("FF2")
 B892002 - Flip-flop (red) ("FF3")
 B892003 - Flip-flop (red) ("FF4")
 B893004, 2P72726 - Pulse logic (orange) ("PL1", "2xPL1")
 B893007 - Pulse logic (orange) ("2xPL2")
 B885000, B164911 - Decade counter ("DC1")
 B890000 - Power amplifier ("PA1")
 B896000 - Twin selector switch for core memories ("2SS1")
 B893005 - Selection gate for core memories ("SG1")
 2P72732 - Pulse generator for core memories ("PG1")
 2P72731 - Read amplifier for core memories ("RA1")

10-series
 2P73701 - Flip-flop ("FF10")
 2P73702 - Flip-flop ("FF11")
 2P73703 - Flip-flop / Bistable multivibrator with built-in trigger gates and set-reset inputs (black) ("FF12")
 Dual trigger gate ("2.TG13")
 Dual trigger gate ("2.TG14")
 Quadruple trigger gate ("4.TG15")
 Dual positive gate inverter amplifier ("2.GI10")
 Dual positive gate inverter amplifier ("2.GI11")
 Dual positive gate inverter amplifier ("2.GI12")
 Gate amplifier ("GA11")
 One-shot multivibrator ("OS11")
 Timer unit ("TU10")
 Pulse driver ("PD11")
 Relay driver ("RD10")
 Relay driver ("RD11")
 Power amplifier ("PA10")
 Pulse shaper ("PS10")
 Numerical indicator tube driver ("ID10")

20-series
 2P73710 - ("2.GI12", "2GI12")

Norbit 2 / Norbit-S family

 60-series
 2NOR60, 2.NOR60 - Twin NOR (black)
 4NOR60, 4.NOR60 - Quadruple NOR (black)
 2.IA60, 2IA60 - Twin inverter amplifier for low power output (blue)
 LPA60 - Twin low power output
 2.LPA60, 2LPA60 - Twin low power output (blue)
 PA60 - Medium power output (blue)
 HPA60 - High power output (black)
 2.SF60, 2SF60 - Twin input switch filter (green)
 TU60 - Timer (red)
 FF60 - Flip-flop
 GLD60 - Grounded load driver (black)

 61-series
 TT61 - Trigger transformer
 UPA61 - Universal power amplifier
 RSA61 - Rectifier and synchroniser
 DOA61 - Differential operational amplifier
 2NOR61, 2.NOR61 - Twin NOR

 90-series
 PS90 - Pulse shaper (green)
 FF90 - Flip-flop (red)
 2TG90, 2.TG90 - Twin trigger gate (red)

 Accessories
 PSU61 - Power supply
 PCB60 - Printed wiring board
 MC60 - Mounting chassis
 UMC60 - Universal mounting chassis
 MB60 - Mounting bar

Photo gallery

See also
 Logic family
 fischertechnik

Notes

References

Further reading
  (43 pages) (NB. Also part of the Valvo-Handbuch 1962 pages 83–125.)
  (253 pages) (NB. Contains a chapter about Norbit modules as well.)
  (25 pages)

External links
 

Logic families
Digital electronics
Solid state engineering
Industrial automation
Control engineering